The 1911 North Carolina Tar Heels football team represented the University of North Carolina in the 1911 college football season. The team captain of the 1911 season was Bob Winston.

Schedule

References

North Carolina
North Carolina Tar Heels football seasons
North Carolina Tar Heels football